Sirio is a low-floor tram built by Ansaldobreda

Sirio may also refer to:

 Sirio Carrapa (born 1952), Italian mystic
 Sirio Maccioni (1932–2020), restaurateur and author based in New York City
 , a Maltese and Panamanian train ferry
 , an Italian immigrant transporter ship, wrecked off Cartagena in 1906
 Sirio, a brand of engines by Italian American Motor Engineering

See also
 Sirius (disambiguation)